Azazel is a name possibly occurring in the book of Leviticus, and the subject of discussion in Rabbinic and Patristic literature.

Azazel may also refer to:

Literature
Azazel (Asimov), the subject of a short story collection and series by Isaac Asimov
Azazel or The Winter Queen, a novel by Boris Akunin
Azazel, a 2008 novel by Youssef Ziedan
Azazel, a character in High School DxD

Comics
Azazel (DC Comics), a character created by Neil Gaiman and Sam Kieth
Azazel (Marvel Comics), a character created by Chuck Austen
Azazel, a character in the manga You're Being Summoned, Azazel

Music
Azazel: Book of Angels Volume 2, an album by the Masada String Trio

Film and TV
Azazel, a demon appearing in the 1998 film Fallen
Azazel, an avenging angel in the ABC Family miniseries Fallen
Azazel (Supernatural)
Azazel (film), made-for-TV version of Boris Akunin's novel

Video games
 Azazel (Tekken)
Azazel, a character from the video game Helltaker
Azazel, playable character from the video game The Binding of Isaac: Rebirth

See also
 Azazeal, a character in the TV series Hex
 Azazello, a character in The Master and Margarita